This is a list of years in the United States.

18th century

19th century

20th century

21st century

See also
 Outline of United States history
 Timeline of United States history

 
United States history-related lists
History of the United States
United States